I'm Fine, How Are You? is an album by the Brazilian jazz drummer and percussionist Airto Moreira released in 1977.

Samples from "Celebration Suite" were later used as the basis for Bellini's 1997 hit song "Samba de Janeiro".

Track listing

Side one
 "I'm fine. How are you?" (Airto Moreira) – 5:11
 "Meni Devol" (Ruben Rada, Hugo Fattoruso) – 5:11
 "La Tumbadora" (Rada, Fattoruso) – 3:39
 "The Happy People" (Moreira) – 3:48

Side two
 "The Road Is Hard (But We're Going To Make It)" (Flora Purim) – 5:32
 "La Cumbia De Andres" (Rada, Fattoruso) – 4:24
 "Celebration Suite" (Moreira) – 4:16
 "Nativity" (feat. Jaco Pastorius) – 6:44

Personnel
Musicians
 Airto Moreira – percussion
 Laudir de Oliveira – percussion on "The Happy People" and "Celebration Suite"
 Manolo Badrena – percussion on "La Tumbadora"
 Hugo Fattoruso – keyboards
 Byron Miller – bass guitar on all tracks except "The Road Is Hard (We We're Going To Make It)"
 Abraham Laboriel – bass guitar on "The Road Is Hard (We We're Going To Make It)"
 Jaco Pastorius – bass guitar on "Nativity"
 Tom Scott – sax, flute on "I'm fine. How are you?" and "The Road Is Hard (We We're Going To Make It)"
 Raul de Souza – trombone on "The Happy People" and "Celebration Suite"
 Charles (Icarus) Johnson – guitar
 Oscar C. Neves – guitar on "The Happy People" and "Celebration Suite"
 Ruben Rada – vocals on "Meni Devol" and "La Tumbadora"
 Flora Purim – vocals on "The Road Is Hard (But We're Going To Make It)"
 Maria Fattoruso – backing vocals

Production
 Kerry McNabb – engineering
 John Cabalka – art direction, design
 Brad Kanawyer – design
 Claude Mougin – photography
 Julian Falk – kite design

References

External links
 

Airto Moreira albums
1977 albums